Yashomati or Yasomati is an Indian female given name. Notable people with the name include:

 Yasomati (died  605 CE), spouse of King Prabhakaravardhana
 Yashomati Chandrakant Thakur (born 1974), Indian politician 

Indian feminine given names